Amirvan is a village and municipality in the Qabala District of Azerbaijan. It has a population of 1,527.

External links 

Populated places in Qabala District